I Was a Teenage Faust is a 2002 made-for-television film of an adolescent who sells his soul to the Devil to achieve popularity. It was directed by Thom Eberhardt and although the film takes place in Indiana, it was filmed in south-western British Columbia.

Plot
The film follows the story of socially inept adolescent Brendan Willy (Josh Zuckerman) who lives in Indiana. When he desires the affections of Twyla Day (Caroline Elliott), Mr. Five, (Robert Townsend) a tempter from Hell, approaches Brendan with an offer to make him popular.

References

External links

2000s fantasy comedy films
2000s teen comedy films
2002 television films
2002 films
American teen comedy films
American television films
Films set in Indiana
Works based on the Faust legend
Films directed by Thom Eberhardt
2000s English-language films
2000s American films